Marcel Ziemer (born 3 August 1985) is a German former professional footballer who played as a forward. He is currently the head coach of TSG Pfeddersheim's U15 team.

Career
In 2004, at the age of 18, Ziemer joined 1. FC Kaiserslautern from lower-league club TuS Neuhausen.

In August 2017, in a 3. Liga match against Preußen Münster with Hansa Rostock, Ziemer tore a cruciate ligament. He was released by Rostock when his contract ran out in summer 2018. In January 2019 he was still in physical rehab.

Coaching career
After an anterior cruciate ligament injury, he left Hansa in the summer 2018. He returned to football in November 2019, when he was hired as head coach of TSG Pfeddersheim's U15 team. Ziemer knew the club's sporting director, Dennis Dell, very well, which was the reason he joined the club.

References

External links
 
 

1985 births
Living people
Association football forwards
German footballers
Germany youth international footballers
1. FC Kaiserslautern players
1. FC Kaiserslautern II players
SV Wehen Wiesbaden players
1. FC Saarbrücken players
FC Hansa Rostock players
Bundesliga players
2. Bundesliga players
3. Liga players
People from Worms, Germany
Footballers from Rhineland-Palatinate